Sapna Babul Ka... Bidaai  is an Indian soap drama that aired from 8 October 2007 to 13 November 2010 on STAR Plus during weekdays. It tells the story of a father and his two daughters and explores the social impacts of skin colour. The series was replaced by Gulaal. In August 2022, rerun of the series started on StarPlus's sister channel Star Bharat.

Plot
Ragini and Sadhana are cousins where Sadhana's mother dies due to her illness in the first few episodes, and Sadhana's father is unable to save her owing to a lack of funds. Sadhana's father promises to fly to the USA in order to accumulate more wealth, and she is given to her maternal uncle Prakash Chandra. Sadhana is now residing in Agra and her father is in California after a 17-year separation. Sadhana's father's greatest wish is to see her as a bride. Sadhana, on the other hand, is desperate to visit her father. She succeeds to win Ragini's and Prakash Chandra's hearts while living with the Sharmas. Ragini's mother, Kaushalya, is concerned because the two have different skin complexions. According to the report, Sadhana's father will return from California and will take Sadhana back to Udaipur one day. Everyone is ecstatic. However, a twist of fate puts an end to all hope. Sadhana's father's plane crashes and he dies as a result of the bad weather. Sadhana is devastated by the news. She eventually decides to stay at the Sharma residence.

Ragini is having difficulty finding a suitable match because of her dark complexion, and she is eventually rejected in favour of the lighter-complexioned Sadhana. One proposal is eventually finalised, and Kaushalya and Ragini's Nani decide to keep Sadhana hidden. Sadhana arrives at Ragini's wedding venue owing to unforeseen circumstances, and the boy's family rejects Ragini once more in favour of Sadhana, causing Kaushalya to attempt suicide, but Prakashchand saves her. Sadhana gets a new job, and everything returns to normal.

Sadhana begins working as a tutor at the Rajvansh family. Ranveer is one of the Rajvansh sons who studied in the USA but has returned for the time being. He has a mentally ill brother named Alekh. Vasundhara, Alekh's mother, believes that marriage will help Alekh improve.

The Sharmas are facing serious financial difficulties and the possibility of losing their home.

Sadhana demands that Vasundhara get Ranveer married to Ragini in exchange for money to save their home. She does so after witnessing Ranveer protecting Ragini's reputation from  few hooligans who criticised her dark complexion, and she believed that he would be a wonderful life partner for Ragini, as well as for him.

Vasundhara deceives Sadhana by agreeing to her demand, but this was just a sham. She sends Ranveer to the United States, while Sadhana marries Alekh and offers to marry them when he returns. Sadhana marries Alekh, but Ragini and Ranveer's marriage does not work out since, Ranvir fell in love with Sonia. Sonia, on the other hand, is revealed to be a gold digger who is just interested in Ranveer's money. Ranveer is devastated by this news and begins to suffer from depression. In a strange twist of destiny, Ragini is the one who saves him when she rings his number by accident and tells him to move on with his life in wonderful words. Ranveer is completely charmed by her comments, and the two gradually begin conversing on the phone on a regular basis, oblivious of each other's identities.

They went by the names Anmol and Anamika. Sadhana eventually figures it out, but she doesn't reveal them and instead trusts God to decide the fate of their friendship. She, on the other hand, tells Alekh about the secret.

Ranveer and Ragini develop feelings for each other and resolve to meet. However, when they met, they were both taken aback, and due to Vasundhara's interference (who refused to accept Ragini as her daughter-in-law due to her dark complexion), Ranveer believes Ragini was aware of his true identity all along, but chose to deceive him in order to marry into a wealthy family. Meanwhile, Ragini is taken aback when she learns that Ranveer is Anmol, and she is distraught when he appears to reject her. Sadhana knew about their true identities all along, and both Ranveer and Ragini hate her for keeping it hidden from them.

However, misunderstandings eventually get cleared up after Ranveer realises that he truly loves Ragini when he learns that very much like him, she had no idea of his real identity and had truly loved him all along as well. He decides that his life is not complete without her and fights tooth and nail to win her love after leaving her heartbroken. Slowly but surely, their love wins over their families, especially their opposing mothers, and they eventually marry. After their marriage, they decide to help Sadhana cure Aalekh so that she can experience a fulfilling marital life as well. They hire a therapist for Alekh, Shlok, who happens to have been an old friend of his, and improvements begin to show in Alekh's health until Alekh begins to think Sadna and Shlok have feelings for each other. This manifests itself when Sadhana is shot in the streets but was saved from further damage by Shlok, and Alekh is devastated that he could have done something for her. He runs away thinking he is not good enough for Sadhana, but is later find and they later make it up. Meanwhile, their two families are planning a formal wedding for the two now that Alekh is showing improvements but at the wedding, Alekh tells Shlok that he would be a better husband for Sadhana and dresses him up as himself and gets him married to Sadhana. However, Shlok, wanting the best for Alekh, ends up revealing himself in the end and reunites him with Sadhana and they have a happy marriage. Ranveer starts investigating what happened with him a fateful Diwali night so he, Ragini, and Sadhana plan to recreate that Diwali night once again. Aalekh relives it and remembers that Ambika killed his grandfather and he was told by Ambika to Aalekh that his grandfather was killed by Vasundhara. Aalekh feels very humiliated and apologizes to Vasundhra. The next day Ambika and Sathyen leave the Rajvansh house and Ambika curses that history will repeat itself and this time it will be Ragini and Sadhna. This all eventually clears up and Aalekh starts living a normal life. They are successful in their quest. Misunderstandings develop between Sadhana and Aalekh after his recovery, especially when Sadhana is kicked out of the Raxhvanxh household being thought of as bad luck after causing a newly pregnant Ragini to fall down the stairs. Vasundhra tricks Sadna into signing divorce papers in exchange for money to fund for Kaushalya's urgent surgery. This is resolved when Sadhana and Alekh prove that they truly cannot be separated, and they all live happily together for a while. Ragini and Sadhana soon become pregnant and the whole family is overjoyed. However, nine months later, tragedy strikes as Sadhana dies in a bomb blast. The whole family is devastated by Sadhana's death. Ragini decides to raise Sadhana's daughter up too along with hers.

7 years later

Ragini is shown bringing her daughter Tamanna up along with Khushi, who is Sadhana's daughter. Ragini and the family commemorate the seventh anniversary of Sadhana's death. It is revealed that Ranveer died, too, in a rock avalanche while saving his friend Anmol's life. Anmol promised Ranveer to look after his family and as a result, he lives in the Rajvansh household as Tamanna's father. After Sadhana and Ranveer's deaths, Alekh has loses his mental balance once again but eventually recovers thanks to the care of a girl named Sakshi who comes close to him. The show ends with Ragini-Anmol and Alekh-Sakshi getting married. Both couples take deceased Sadhana and Ranveer's blessings and perform the Bidaai (farewell) ritual.

Cast

Main
Parul Chauhan as Ragini Sharma Sareen: Kaushalya and Prakash's daughter; Vineet and Sadhana sister; Ranveer's widow; Anmol's wife; Tamanna's mother (2007–2010)
Sara Khan as Sadhana Awasthy Rajvansh: Kamla and Kishan's daughter; Ragini and Vineet sister. Alekh's first wife; Khushi's mother (2007–2010) (Dead)
Kinshuk Mahajan as Ranveer Rajvansh: Vasundhara and Inderjit's younger son; Alekh's brother; Ragini's first husband; Tamanna's father (2008–2010) (dead)
Angad Hasija as Alekh Rajvansh: Vasundhara and Inderjit's elder son; Ranveer's brother; Sadhana's widower; Sakshi's husband; Khushi's father (2008–2010)
Apurva Agnihotri as Anmol Sareen: Ranveer's friend; Ragini's second husband; Tamanna's adoptive father (2010)
Sulagna Panigrahi as Sakshi Narang Rajvansh: Alekh's second wife; Khushi's adoptive mother (2010)

Recurring
Nirali Desai as Tamanna Rajvansh: Ragini and Ranveer's daughter; Anmol's adoptive daughter; Khushi and Kavyansh's cousin (2010)
Divya Naaz as Khushi Rajvansh: Sadhana and Alekh's daughter; Sakshi's adoptive daughter; Tamanna and Kavyansh's cousin (2010) 
Amardeep Jha as Sumitra Bajpai: Kaushalya's mother; Ragini and Vineet's grandmother; Kavyansh and Tamanna's great-grandmother (2007–2010)
Mahesh Thakur as Kishan Chand Awasthy: Kamla's husband; Sadhana's father; Khushi's grandfather (2007)
Alok Nath as Prakash Chandra Sharma: Kamla's brother; Kaushalya's husband; Ragini and Vineet's father; Kavyansh and Tamanna's grandfather (2007–2010)
Vibha Chibber as Kaushalya Sharma: Prakash's wife; Ragini and Vineet's mother; Kavyansh and Tamanna's grandmother (2007–2010)
Ashita Dhawan as Malti Sharma: Vineet's wife; Kavyansh's mother (2007–2010)
Naveen Saini as Vineet Sharma: Kaushalya and Prakash's son; Ragini's brother; Sadhana's cousin; Malti's husband; Kavyansh's father (2007–2010)
Siddharth Kumar as Kavyansh "Kavya" Sharma: Malti and Vineet's son; Tamanna and Khushi's cousin (2010)
Shambhavi Sharma as Gujri (2007–2010)
Seema Kapoor as Vasundhara Rajvansh: Inderjit's wife; Ranveer and Alekh's mother; Tamanna and Khushi's grandmother (2008–2010)
Avinash Wadhawan as Inderjit Singh Rajvansh: Vasundhara's husband; Ranveer and Alekh's father; Tamanna and Khushi's grandfather (2008–2010)
Natasha Rana as Ambika Rajvansh: Satyen's wife (2008–2009)
Aliraza Namdar as Satyen Rajvansh (2008–2009)
Vimarsh Roshan as Naveen Rajvansh (2008–2010)
Preeti Puri as Avni Naveen Rajvansh (2008–2010)
Rajeev Verma as Harshvardhan Rajvansh (Dadaji), Father of Inderjit and Satyen (2009)
Sulakshana Khatri as Gayatri Devi (Bua Dadi), Harshvardhan's younger sister (2009)
Rahul Lohani as Karan Inderjit Rajvansh (2010)
Shafaq Naaz as Guni Rajvansh (2008–2010)
Shabana Mullani as Dolly Rajvansh (2008–2010)
Manish Raisinghan as Saket (2007)
Utkarsha Naik as Sulakshana (2007)
Kartik Sabharwal as Shailendra (2007)
Rajendra Chawla as Kamlesh Awasthy, Sadhna's uncle, Kishanchand's brother (2007)
Pragati Mehra as Sadhna's aunt, Kamlesh's wife (2007)
Sadiya Siddiqui as Ragini's dance teacher (2007)
Vishal Singh as Rajveer (2007)
Rucha Gujarathi as Sonia (2007)
Madhura Naik as Sonia Singh/ Sonia Chopra (2008)
Eva Grover as Sheetal (2008)
Puneet Tejwani as Dr. Shlok (2009)
Aruna Singhal as Shakuntala (2009)
Amar Upadhyay as Advocate Dhananjay Singhania (2009)
Prerna Wanvari as Shivani (2010)
Kamalika Guha Thakurta as Vidyashree Shasthry (2010)
Rajshree Thakur as Nishtha Vasudev (2009)
Smriti Sinha as Maillika Mehra (2010)
Amit Singh Thakur as Mr. Mehra (2010)
Seerat Ain Alam as Isha (2010)
Puneet Sachdev as Tarun (2010)
Rajesh Khattar as Bittu

Guests
Hema Malini as chief guest of Taj Mahotsav (2007)
Hansika Motwani as Chief Guest of Natraj Mahotsav (2010)
Neha Bamb as herself from Maayka (2008)
Dalljiet Kaur as herself from Santaan (2008)
Additi Gupta as Heer from Kis Desh Mein Hai Meraa Dil (2009)
Harshad Chopra as Prem from Kis Desh Mein Hai Meraa Dil (2009)
Puja Banerjee as Vrinda from Tujh Sang Preet Lagai Sajna (2009)
Drashti Dhami as Geet from Geet – Hui Sabse Parayi (2010)
Karan Tacker as Shantanu from Rang Badalti Odhani (2010)
Hina Khan as Akshara from Yeh Rishta Kya Kehlata Hai (2010)
Karan Mehra as Naitik from Yeh Rishta Kya Kehlata Hai (2010)
Ragini Khanna as Suhana from Sasural Genda Phool (2010)
Jay Soni as Ishaan from Sasural Genda Phool (2010)
Pooja Gaur as Pratigya from Mann Kee Awaaz Pratigya (2010)
Manasi Parekh as Gulaal to promote the show Zindagi Ka Har Rang... Gulaal (2010)

Production

Development
Bidaai is the first offering of Producer Rajan Shahi under Director's Kut Production. The initial phase of the series is inspired from the Bollywood film Vivah of Rajshri Productions.

Filming
The series is based on the backdrop of Agra. The series was mainly filmed in Mumbai at the sets in Mira Road. Besides, some scenes were filmed in and on the outskirts of Agra including Taj Mahal.

Casting
Speaking about his role, male lead Angad Hasija said, "My character Alekh was a Schizophrenic. Initially, I had a problem, but I really worked hard to build the character," Initially, Hasija was rejected for the role by Producer Rajan Shahi considering his long hair and physique appearance not suitable. After working on those, Shahi accepted him for the role of Alekh.

In October 2007, shooting of the series was stalled for a while when the Labour Union protested for hiring men for erecting the sets from outside rather than the members from the Film Studio Setting and Allied Mazdoor Union as per the rules.

In October 2008, a special sequence of celebrating Taj Mahotsav was shot in Agra where Hema Malini was roped for a guest appearance as the chief guest of the event. Besides, Shweta Tiwari and Anjali Abrol appeared as the performers of that event and Vivan Bhatena also made a special appearance for the event.

In November 2008, the shootings and telecast of all the Hindi television series including this series and films were stalled on 8 November 2008 due to dispute by the technician workers of FWICE (Federation of Western India Cine Employees) for increasing the wages, better work conditions and more breaks between shootings. FWICE first took a strike on 1 October 2008 when they addressed their problems with the producers and production was stalled. A contract was signed after four days discussions and shooting were happening only for two hours content in a day then after which differences increased between them while channels gave them time until 30 October 2008 to sort it out. Failing to do so lead to protests again from 10 November 2008 to 19 November 2008 during which channels blacked out new broadcasts and repeat telecasts were shown from 10 November 2008. On 19 November 2008, the strike was called off after settling the disputes and the production resumed. The new episodes started to telecast from 1 December 2008. Shahi reported about ₹7 Lakh losses due to the stalling of production and telecast.

In December 2009, the shoot of the series was stalled for three hours due to the morcha by some group of women when the lead sisters Sadhna and Ragini were shown developing differences between them in their marital home in the series which they condemned. However, they were pacified by Producer Rajan Shahi, Sara Khan and Parul Chauhan playing Sadhna and Ragini and the shootings resumed.

In January 2009, Eva Grover was cast as Sheetal for a small cameo. Good response her role made it to be extended. In February 2009, the honeymoon track of the characters Sadhna and Alekh, Ragini and Ranbir was filmed in Kerala where Payal Nair and Anupam Bhattacharya were cast as Gayathri and Madhavan for a cameo. Initially they were supposed to go to Switzerland for the honeymoon sequence which could not as Sara Khan playing Sadhna did not have passport and time to arrange for it which was required soon and Kerala was finalized for it. A sequence during the last day shoot in a beach in Kerala was stalled in between due to dispute between the production unit and the local fishermen there and thus being cut during telecast.

In February 2010, film actress Hansika Motwani was seen in a cameo as the chief guest of the dance competition event Natraj Mahotsav in the series. Besides Mouli Ganguly played the cameo of host, Sangita Ghosh and Sanjeeda Sheikh being the performers in the event. In June 2010, to increase the ratings, one of the main characters was killed, causing Sara Khan to exit the series. Soon, when a generation leap followed, one of the male leads Kinshuk Mahajan quit where his character was also killed and Apurva Agnihotri was cast as the new male lead opposite Parul Chauhan. Following it, in August 2010 Sulagna Panigrahi was cast as Sakshi opposite Hasija.

Crossover
In 2009, they had a crossover episode with Yeh Rishta Kya Kehlata Hai. Gulaal which replaced the series in its slot had a crossover with it during the end of Bidaai.

Cancellation
The end of the series was first planned six months before it went off air when the ratings were declining. Otherwise, shifting it to an afternoon slot was not considered as they thought it might degrade its popularity. The channel prompted the producer to introduce twists like the death of the character Sadhna and a time leap after which the ratings rose. However, the series went off air on 13 November 2010. Speaking about the reason for ending, executive director of Star channel Vivek Bahl stated: "The show has run its course, and both, the channel and the producer, didn't feel the need to stretch the story. We didn't want to end the show once the number started falling. Bidaai has been a top show, and deserves to go like a top show," Producer Rajan Shahi stated that they wanted the series to end on a high note.

After its end, there were also many reports for the second season being in progress. However Shahi denied it.

Reception

Critics
On Bidaai's success, The telegraph stated, "Bidaai didn't turn out to be too hatke (out of the box), but the identifiable characters and slice-of-life situations struck a chord."

Praising the two shows Bidaii and Yeh Rishta Kya Kehlata Hai of Rajan Shahi's Director's Kut Production as game changers of Starplus which do not have excessive camera moves and mother in law – daughter in law melodramas unlike previously aired dramas, The Times of India stated, "The shows adequately highlighted the quintessential emotions with loads of romanticism and simplicity in story-telling."

Ratings
Bidaai started off with 4.7 TVR during its premiere in October 2007 featuring in top 10 shows. Soon, in December 2007, it rose 5.4 TVR.

It also became the first Hindi GEC to beat Kyunki Saas Bhi Kabhi Bahu Thi to the top position at that time garnering 5.28 TVR during first week January 2008. Until March 2008, it shuffled in and out of top ten shows. In March 2008, it got 6 TVR on one of the leads Sadhana and Alekh's wedding track. Since April 2008 to September 2008, it was consistently the number one series except twice in June 2008, when it was pushed to second by Kyunki Saas Bhi Kabhi Bahu Thi and Star Parivaar Awards. In the week during 5 to 11 October 2008, it was second most watched after Balika Vadhu with 6 TVR. Its highest rating garnered in the year was 8.8 TVR for the Taj Mahotsav sequence in October 2008. In November 2008 overall, it was the second most watched Hindi show with averaging between 5 and 6 TVR.

In January 2009, it recorded its highest rating of 9.6 TVR during lead characters Ragini and Ranveer's marriage. In week 9 of 2009, it occupied second position with 6.3 TVR. When the nine-year dominant number one position of StarPlus channel was beaten by Colors TV channel in week ending 11 April 2009, Bidaai and Yeh Rishta Kya Kehlata Hai were the top watched Hindi shows with 7.4 and 7 TVR. Overall in the year, it was the third most watched with 9.5 TVR.

As in February 2010, it maintained its top position with 5 to 6 TVR. In early March, it occupied second position after Yeh Rishta with 6.8 TVR. Until June 2010, it ranged between 5 and 7 TVR. However, when the series took a leap in June 2010, ratings dipped and it went out of top 5 watched Hindi programs to 10th position. Between June and July it ranged between 2 and 5 TVR. From October to November 2010 it ranged 2 to 3 TVR while the last episode of two hours duration aired on 13 November 2010 garnered 6.06 TVR, becoming the second most watched Hindi GEC in that week.

Impact
Writer Shoma Munshi in their book Prime time soap operas on Indian Television had included the series among her five specific serials chosen for analysis stating, "I chose 'Saat Phere… Saloni Ka Safar' and 'Sapna Babul Ka… Bidaai' as a counterfoil, because they were the first to challenge the K soaps' supremacy, and both were issue-based, focusing on the dark skin/fair skin thesis."

In January 2008, creative head of Zee TV and the writer of Saat Phere: Saloni Ka Safar accused Bidaai as a copy of Saat Phere, where both of them deals with the story of a dark complexion girl with different story lines for which Producer Rajan Shahi stated, "Why is the comparison being made after four months of Bidaai's launch? Is it because our show is doing better?".

Dialogue from the episode aired on 6 October 2009, was said by Angad Hasija on Valmiki to have offended the Valmiki community and the series telecast had a black out in Punjab for 2 months. When Punjab police came to arrest the actor and Producer Rajan Shahi after a FIR was filed on them, but they got interim bail. In September 2009, Information and broadcasting ministry sent a notice to Star regarding it. When Star and Producer approached Punjab and Haryana High Court to quash the FIR stating that they did not intend to hurt the feelings of Valmiki Community and the FIR was due to the out of context misinterpretation of that dialogue. However, court dismissed their queries and stated them to face the trial. When it was taken over to Supreme court, they also dismissed stating the same. Later, on arguments in the court, the FIR was finally quashed and the petition was dismissed.

References

External links

2007 Indian television series debuts
2010 Indian television series endings
StarPlus original programming